Van Rensselaer may refer to:
Van Rensselaer family, a prominent Dutch American family
Van Rensselaer (surname), a surname (including a list of people with the name)
Van Rensselaer Island, an island in the Hudson River opposite the city of Albany, New York, United States
Van Rensselaer Lower Manor House, Claverack, New York, United States
Van Rensselaer Hall, a dormitory for women at Drexel University
Martha Van Rensselaer Hall, a building of Cornell University College of  Human Ecology

See also
Van Rensselaer Richmond (1812–1883), New York civil engineer and politician
Rensselaer (disambiguation)
Rensselaerswyck
Van Rensselaer's Regiment
Edgar Van Ranseleer, a character in Archie Bunker's Place